The Return of Bruno is a 1987 comedic film, originally aired as a one-hour special on HBO and later released on VHS. It is a mockumentary starring Bruce Willis as his fictitious alter-ego "Bruno Radolini," a legendary blues singer/musician who influenced, as the story goes, a number of other famous musicians. Phil Collins, Elton John, Ringo Starr, Jon Bon Jovi, Freddie Garrity, Brian Wilson, Grace Slick, Joan Baez, Graham Nash, Stephen Stills, Melvin Franklin, The Bee Gees, Paul Stanley and Bobby Colomby appear in the film as themselves, paying tribute to Radolini. It also features Bill Graham, Wolfman Jack, Michael J. Fox, Clive Davis, Henry Diltz and Don Cornelius. It is narrated by Dick Clark.

It was written by Paul Flattery, Bruce V. DiMattia, and Kenny Solms. It was produced by Paul Flattery and directed by Jim Yukich.

All the film's songs are taken from Willis' musical album The Return of Bruno except "No One's Home" by Bruce V. DiMattia and "Peter Gunn" by Henry Mancini.

The film was nominated for a 1988 ACE award (Award for Cable Excellence) (now known as CableACE Awards) in the category "Writing a Musical Special or Series."

External links

1987 short films
1980s musical comedy films
1987 films
American musical comedy films
1987 comedy films
1980s English-language films
1980s American films
Bruce Willis